KPLZ-FM (101.5 MHz) is a commercial radio station in Seattle, Washington.  It is owned and operated by Lotus Communications and it airs an adult contemporary radio format.  The studios and offices are co-located with former sister station KOMO-TV within KOMO Plaza (formerly Fisher Plaza) in the Lower Queen Anne section of Seattle, directly across the street from the Space Needle.

KPLZ has an effective radiated power (ERP) of 99,000 watts (100,000 watts with beam tilt).  The transmitter is located on Cougar Mountain in Issaquah.  KPLZ broadcasts using HD Radio technology.  Its HD2 digital subchannel simulcasts the all-news format on KNWN and the HD3 subchannel simulcasts the talk format on KVI.

History

Easy listening (1959-1970)
On , the station signed on the air.  The original call sign was KETO-FM. It was owned by Chem-Air, Inc. and featured an easy listening format.  Its effective radiated power was 10,000 watts.  

The 1960 edition of "Broadcasting Yearbook" showed an advertisement for KETO-FM as "Your key to good listening."  A sketch of a pelican was included in the ad, wearing headphones and holding a key (for KEY-to). However, in the 1960s, few people owned FM radios and the audience was limited.

Country (1970-1976) 
By 1970, KETO-FM had increased its power to 100,000 watts.  It tried a country music format, competing against juggernaut KAYO (now KKNW) for country music listeners.

Top 40 (1976-1981)
In 1976, Seattle hosted a two-station Top 40 ratings battle between KING and KJR.  Golden West Broadcasters, owned by entertainer Gene Autry, bought KETO-FM in 1976.  Golden West already owned KVI, which had a popular middle of the road/adult contemporary format.  Management decided to switch the FM station's call sign to KVI-FM, calling it "The FM KVI," and wanted to give it a younger sound to complement the AM station.  KVI-FM flipped to a Top 40 format, becoming the company's first station with the format. The first song played under the new format was "Beginnings" by Chicago. The KVI-FM's first program director was Frank Colbourn, who relocated to Seattle from Monterey, California, to sign-on the new format.

The new format quickly became popular as AM music began to lose some of its audience to the FM band.  Colbourn earned the station twelve gold records from artists such as Stevie Wonder, Exile, and Donna Summer. However, there was some confusion between KVI (which had switched to a talk format), and its Golden West sister station, KVI-FM.  In 1978, KVI-FM became "K-Plus 101" and changed its call letters to KPLZ.

In the late 1970s, while KJR and KING maintained Mainstream Top-40 formats, "K-Plus" became the area's de facto disco music station for a couple of years, airing a higher percentage of dance hits than the AM Top 40 stations.

Adult contemporary (1981-1983) 
The death of disco, combined with the 1981 sign-on of Top-40 upstart KBLE-FM, which later became KUBE, signaled a tough ratings environment for KPLZ in the early 1980s.

In response, KPLZ moved slightly towards an adult contemporary format, using the slogan "The Music Magazine" and branding as simply "KPLZ."  However, under the leadership of Program Director Jeff King, and later Casey Keating, the station was in a close race in the ratings with KUBE for Top 40 supremacy during the 1980s.

Top 40 (1983-1992) 
The station moved back to Mainstream Top 40 by September 1983, changing its slogan to "Hot Hits."  It began using a Hot Hits jingle package and formatics developed by Mike Joseph, who created the Hot Hits format, adopted by numerous radio stations in the early 1980s.  KPLZ later changed its moniker to "Z 101.5," before moving back to "101.5 KPLZ" in the late 1980s. During its "Z 101.5" days, KPLZ was an affiliate of Rick Dees Weekly Top 40.

Rhythmic (1992-1994) 
KUBE struggled for a time, but ultimately adopted a Rhythmic CHR approach in early 1992. During this time, KPLZ's ratings dropped while KUBE ascended the ratings ladder.  KPLZ tried various angles of the format, such as counteracting KUBE's rhythmic direction with a more mainstream CHR direction, as well as emphasizing hits from the previous 5 years. When that strategy didn't work, KPLZ began playing more rhythmic titles by January 1993.

Fisher Communications bought the station in 1994.

Hot adult contemporary (1994-present)
On January 28, 1994, at 1 p.m., KPLZ finally gave up on Top 40 and flipped to Hot AC as "Star 101.5." The first song on "Star" was "Waiting for a Star to Fall" by Seattle duo Boy Meets Girl. Kent Phillips and Alan Budwill, who have hosted mornings on the station since 1986, remained after the flip to "Star" and continued until December 2018, when Budwill retired and Phillips moved to afternoons; mornings would then be hosted by Curt Kruse and Corine McKenzie and producer Leonard Barokas until they were let go from the station in March 2021.

On April 11, 2013, Fisher Communications announced that it would sell its properties, including KPLZ-FM, to the Sinclair Broadcast Group.  Fisher owned radio stations in Seattle and in Great Falls, Montana, as well as TV stations in Washington, Oregon, Idaho, California and other markets.

Although Sinclair primarily owns television stations, the company said it would retain KPLZ, talk radio KVI, all-news radio KOMO and continued to lease KOMO-FM as a simulcast of KOMO (AM) (KOMO-FM would be purchased outright by Sinclair in June 2020). The deal was completed on August 8, 2013.

On June 3, 2021, Sinclair announced they would sell KPLZ, KVI and KOMO-AM-FM to Lotus Communications for $18 million. Sinclair retained KOMO-TV. The sale was completed on September 28, 2021.

Christmas music
KPLZ spends the latter part of each year playing an all-Christmas music format. In 2016, the station briefly rebranded as "Santa FM," which sparked rumors of a format change or rebranding away from the "Star" name after the holiday season. However, at midnight on December 26, KPLZ returned to its Hot AC format and the "Star" branding, but adjusted its playlist to include some additional gold/recurrent songs from the 1980s, 1990s, and 2000s.

References

External links

PLZ-FM
Hot adult contemporary radio stations in the United States
Radio stations established in 1959
Lotus Communications stations